Princess Lillifee and the Little Unicorn is a 2011 German animated film directed by Ansgar Niebuhr and Hubert Weiland. It is the sequel to the 2009 film Prinzessin Lillifee.

Cast
 Maresa Sedlmeier as Lillifee (voice)
 Carin Tietze as Rosalie (voice)
 Sabine Bohlmann as Clara (voice)
 Stefan Günther as Iwan (voice)
 Julia Haacke as Cindy (voice)
 Gudo Hoegel as Carlos (voice)
 Sandra Schwittau as Pupsi (voice)
 Jochen Striebeck as Crunch (voice)
 Roman Wolko as Prinz Tau (voice)
 Patrick Roche as Prinz Eis (voice)
 Max Felder as Fabian (voice)
 Dagmar Dempe as Fabians Mutter (voice)

References

External links
 
 

2011 films
2011 animated films
German animated films
2010s German-language films
German children's films
2010s German films